The 2020 División de Honor de Béisbol will be the 35th season of the top Spanish baseball league since its establishment and the 75th Spanish championship overall. The start of the season was postponed due to coronavirus pandemic.

Tenerife Marlins are the defending champions.

Teams

Antorcha Valencia promoted to the league after finish the previous season as champion of Primera División (tier 2).

League table

References

External links
Spanish Baseball and Softball Federation website

División de Honor de Béisbol
2020 in Spanish sport